The Regional Centre of Excellence for Music & Performing Arts (RCEMPA) is a cultural center located at Jotsoma, Kohima District, Nagaland, India. The center has a multipurpose hall and a gallery of contemporary art which provides artists to display and sell their art on spot.

References

External links 

Culture of Nagaland
Kohima
Buildings and structures in Kohima
Event venues established in 2013
2013 establishments in Nagaland